Hutchinson Industries is a Trenton, New Jersey-based military manufacturer that produces runflats for the United States Armed Forces.

References 

Companies based in Trenton, New Jersey
Private military contractors